Lakshman Nipuna Arachchi is a Sri Lankan politician and a former member of the Parliament of Sri Lanka. He is the replacement for former army chief Sarath Fonseka in Sri Lanka's parliament. He is currently the General Secretary of Leftiest Janatha Vimukthi Peramuna led National People's Power Alliance.

References

Year of birth missing (living people)
Living people
Members of the 13th Parliament of Sri Lanka
Janatha Vimukthi Peramuna politicians
United People's Freedom Alliance politicians